Forbach is a commune in the French department of Moselle, northeastern French region of Grand Est.

It is located on the German border approximately 15 minutes from the center of Saarbrücken, Germany, with which it constitutes a cross-border conurbation, and is part of the Saar-Moselle Eurodistrict. In 2017, Forbach had a population of 21,552 inhabitants, which, including its greater urban area, makes it the largest town in the eastern Moselle area.

History 
Forbach is located in an area inhabited for a long time. Remains of the Celtic and especially Roman eras have been found in Forbach.

Medieval era 
A castle was built on the Schlossberg hill at the end of the 12th century. It was gradually enlarged and, around 1550, connected to the city by an enclosure wall. Between the 10th century and 1793, many seigneurs owned the seigneury of Forbach. Johann Fischart, a prolific satirical writer, worked as a bailiff at Forbach Castle where he stayed from 1583 to 1590.

The chapel of the Holy Cross of Forbach was mentioned in a letter from 1338 by the Bishop of Metz, Adhémar of Monteil, under the name of capella sancta crucis juxta Forbachum. It was probably built in the 13th century. It was extensively renovated in the 14th and 15th centuries. It was probably the property of the Hombourg-Haut congregations since 1257. It was badly damaged during the Thirty Years' War.

War of 1870, German annexation and WW1 
Until the Franco-Prussian War, Forbach was in the French orbit. However, after the nearby Battle of Spicheren in August 1870, the town was occupied by German troops, and at the conclusion of the war annexed to Germany, forming part of the imperial province of Alsace–Lorraine. The region was returned to France in 1918.

Post-WW2 period 
Before the Schengen Treaty, Forbach was a major border crossing at which customs procedures were carried out, both for road and for rail transport and travel.  Since 2007, the TGV and ICE high speed trains connecting Paris and Frankfurt have stopped at the station in Forbach, and passengers can now travel to Paris Gare de l'Est in 1 hour and 45 minutes and to the German financial center and airport in the Frankfurt and Rhine-Main metropolis in 2 hours.

Its location in the Saar-Warndt coal mining basin, which extends into eastern Moselle, made Forbach an important mining town, with offices of the Houillères du Bassin de Lorraine (Lorraine coal mining board), a section of the French Coal Board. When the mining operations were permanently shut down in 2004, Forbach turned to activities in the tourism, service, energy and other industries to rebuild the local economy. The "Musée des Mineurs - Wendel" in the neighboring village of Petite-Rosselle is a coal mining museum which preserves the industrial and cultural heritage from the coal mining era in the Forbach region. It was awarded the "Musées de France" quality label in 2002.

Population

Notable people from Forbach
 Nicolas Appert (1749–1841), inventor, notably of the canning technique
 Claire Burger, journalist, screenwriter and film director. Her 2008 short film, Forbach, was awarded by the Cinéfoundation in 2008 and she received the "Ensemble Prize" along with Marie Amachoukeli and Samuel Theis in the category "A Certain Regard" (Un Certain Regard) for their first feature film, Party Girl, at the 2014 Cannes Film Festival.
Jean-Luc Cairon (born 1962), gymnast and coach
 Helmut Fritz (born 1975), singer
 Jean-Nicolas Houchard (1740–1793), French General, whose name appears on the Arc de Triomphe in Paris
 Sophie Huber (born 1985), freestyle swimmer
 Eugene Jolas (1894–1952), journalist, poet and translator, best known for founding the modernist Parisian journal transition (which published, notably, James Joyce's "Finnegans Wake").
 Patricia Kaas (born 1966), singer from Stiring-Wendel (near Forbach)
 Christian von Zweibrücken (1782–1859), Bavarian general
Sam Hocevar (born 1978), Debian project leader from 17 April 2007 to 16 April 2008
Loris Frasca Olympic Gymnast

See also

Communes of the Moselle department

Gallery

Notes

External links

  
 Eurodistrict website 
 English website for the Musée les Mineurs-Wendel

Communes of Moselle (department)
Subprefectures in France
Duchy of Lorraine